Helen Anne Durham  (born 1968), an international humanitarian lawyer, was the Director of International Law and Policy at the International Committee of the Red Cross (ICRC) from 2014 until 2022. Durham served as director of international law, strategy, planning and research at the Australian Red Cross, and has worked as ICRC head of office in Sydney as well as legal adviser to the ICRC Pacific region delegation.

She has a PhD in international humanitarian law and international criminal law, worked at the Asia Pacific Centre for Military law as director of research and was a senior fellow at Melbourne Law School.

In 2014, Durham was inducted into the Victorian Honour Roll of Women.

Durham was one of the participants at TEDxSydney in May 2015, where she explained that, even in the worst conflicts, there is still a space for humanity.

In 2017 Durham was appointed an Officer of the Order of Australia for distinguished service to international relations in the area of humanitarian and criminal law, to the protection of women during times of armed conflict, and to legal education.

Durham is married to singer/songwriter Greg Arnold. The couple have two children. She was the inspiration for the song "Happy Birthday Helen" by Arnold's band Things of Stone and Wood.

References

1968 births
Living people
Australian women lawyers
Australian humanitarians
Women humanitarians
Melbourne Law School alumni
Officers of the Order of Australia
University of Melbourne women
20th-century Australian lawyers
21st-century Australian lawyers